Canoe Lake is a lake in the Township of Madawaska Valley in Combermere, Renfrew County, Ontario, Canada.

There is a second Canoe Lake in Renfrew County that is also part of the Madawaska system, Canoe Lake (Greater Madawaska), on the Highland Creek tributary further downstream.

References

Lakes of Renfrew County